The Governors Ball Music Festival (commonly known as Governors Ball or Gov Ball) is a multi-day music festival held in New York City. Launched in 2011 by original founders Jordan Wolowitz, Tom Russell, Yoni Reisman, the festival features an array of genres and styles of music, including rock, electronic, hip-hop, indie, Americana, pop, folk, and more. It is produced by Founders Entertainment, a festival promotion company based in New York City, which also produces The Meadows Music & Arts Festival.  Aside from the wide variety of music, the festival features a multitude of popular New York restaurants and food trucks, as well as activities and games.

History

2011
The inaugural Governors Ball was held on June 18, 2011, on Governors Island in New York City. The one-day festival was headlined by Girl Talk, Pretty Lights, and Empire of the Sun. Governors Ball Music festival 2011 amassed the highest attendance of any event in the history of Governors Island, outselling Dave Matthews Band Caravan and Bassnectar's Bass Island in 2011. Reviews for the 2011 festival were positive, with Flavorwire reporting, "As many area festival attempts often fall flat due to poor execution, the Governors Ball was a pleasant exception to the rule, leaving us looking forward to its return next year," and Gothamist reporting, "A gorgeous day at Governors Island...everyone seemed to leave sunburned and happy."

2012 
Governors Ball 2012, the second year of the festival, was held June 23–24, 2012, on Randall's Island in New York City. Expanding to a two-day event, the festival featured many more acts in order to fill both days. The 2012 version of the festival was headlined by Beck, Passion Pit, Kid Cudi, and Modest Mouse. Randall's Island was chosen as the new venue of the festival due to the event's growth.  Food offerings at the 2012 event included Coolhaus ice cream, Luke's Lobster, Waffles & Dinges, Mexicue, Food Freaks, Philz Steaks, Ports Coffee, and Pie for the People. Activities at the event included lawn games such as cornhole, ladder golf, and croquet (sponsored by Zog Sports), ping pong (sponsored by SPiN New York), and silent disco. Reviews of the 2012 festival were positive, with Time Out NY saying: "[Governors Ball] has all the necessities of a first-class music fest," and Vogue noting, "The summer music festival New Yorkers can finally call their own."

2013

Shortly after the 2012 festival, Founders Entertainment announced that the 2013 festival would take place on June 7–9 on Randall's Island.

It rained heavily on the Friday, June 7, the opening day of the festival, which caused massive transportation delays to and from the island.  The festival was also forced to shut down early on Friday evening due to weather-related safety concerns, and several performers were cancelled, including headliner Kings of Leon. Much of the surface of the green lawns in the festival grounds had become mud by Saturday morning, thus there were extremely muddy conditions for most of the festival.

2014

On January 8, 2014, the dates for the 2014 edition of the Governors Ball Music Festival were announced. It again took place over three days on Randall's Island, from June 6 to June 8. On January 9, 2014 Rolling Stone announced that Outkast would be one of the headliners; headlining alongside Jack White, Vampire Weekend and The Strokes.

2015
Governor's Ball 2015 took place June 5–7, 2015. It rained during the second day, but, unlike previous years, the festival was not cancelled. Ponchos and umbrellas were sold, at the festival carried on, albeit a bit delayed.

2016

The sixth iteration of Governors Ball took place over June 3–5, 2016. All three days of the festival sold out. Saturday evening, the festival grounds were subject to heavy rains, but the event was not cancelled. However, Sunday was cancelled due to heavy rain and safety concerns, and fans received refunds; festival management wrote: "The safety of fans, artists and crew always comes first."

The cancellation of Sunday's shows led to some bands' announcing pop-up shows. That night, Two Door Cinema Club played the Music Hall of Williamsburg, Courtney Barnett played a free show at Rough Trade, Prophets of Rage played at Warsaw Brooklyn, and Vic Mensa (tag-teaming with Galantis, who had a scheduled "After Dark" performance) played a sold-out Webster Hall. Late Sunday night, Kanye West announced he would hold a 2am show somewhere in Manhattan; anticipating this, crowds began to gather at venues across the city.  Musician 2 Chainz posted that they would be at Webster Hall; over 4,000 fans rushed to the venue, blocking streets and triggering an NYPD response. Kanye arrived at the venue, but didn't perform.

2017
The seventh edition of Governors Ball took place at Randall's Island Park in New York City from June 2–4, 2017. Tickets for the festival went on sale January 6, 2017 and the lineup for the 2017 edition of Governors Ball was announced January 4, 2017.

2018
The eighth edition took place at Randall's Island Park in New York City from June 1–3, 2018. Eminem, Jack White, Travis Scott and Yeah Yeah Yeahs headlined the festival.

Originally, Brockhampton was to perform at this edition, however, the hip hop group was subsequently replaced in the lineup by Pusha T following sexual misconduct allegations involving former band member Ameer Vann.

2019
The ninth edition was held at Randall's Island Park in New York City from May 31-June 2, 2019. The Strokes, Florence + the Machine, Tyler, the Creator and Nas headlined the festival.

On Sunday, there was a delayed opening at 6:30pm, and an evacuation around 9:30pm because of severe thunderstorms. This resulted in the majority of the day's acts being cancelled or shortened.

2020 (cancelled) 
The tenth edition was to be held at Randall's Island Park in New York City from June 5–7, 2020, but was cancelled due to the ongoing COVID-19 pandemic.  Tame Impala, Stevie Nicks, Miley Cyrus, Flume, Vampire Weekend, Ellie Goulding, Missy Elliott, Solange, Rüfüs Du Sol, and H.E.R. would have headlined the festival.

2021 
The tenth edition was held at the parking lot area of Citi Field in the New York City borough of Queens from September 24 to 26, 2021. This is the first time since 2011 that the festival was not held at Randalls Island, as well as the first time the festival was held outside of its usual early June timeframe. Billie Eilish, A$AP Rocky, J Balvin and Post Malone headlined the festival.

2022 
The eleventh edition occurred from June 10 to 12, 2022 at Citi Field in the New York City borough of Queens. Kid Cudi, Halsey, and J. Cole headlined the festival.

2023 
The twelfth edition of the festival will be held from June 9 to 11, 2023, at Flushing Meadows–Corona Park in Queens. The headliners, announced January 17, will be Kendrick Lamar, Lizzo, and Odesza. Other performers include Lil Nas X, Haim, Rina Sawayama, Pusha T, Snail Mail, Lil Uzi Vert, Diplo, Giveon, Lil Baby, PinkPantheress, Black Midi, Girl in Red, Tems, Finneas, Kenny Beats, Kim Petras, Omar Apollo, Joey Badass, Amber Mark, Syd, and the festival's first ever K-pop act Aespa.

References

External links

Music festivals in New York City
Rock festivals in the United States